Goswa is a village in Kachauna tehsil, Hardoi district, Uttar Pradesh state, India.

References

 

Villages in Hardoi district